This is a list of Bethune–Cookman Wildcats football players in the NFL draft.

Key

Selections

References

Bethune-Cookman

Bethune-Cookman Wildcats NFL draft